Joachim Stanisław Brudziński (born 4 February 1968 in Świerklaniec) is a Polish conservative politician. He was elected (first time) to the Sejm on 25 September 2005, getting 14,731 votes in 41 Szczecin district as a candidate from the Prawo i Sprawiedliwość (Law and Justice) list. Brudziński graduated from the political sciences faculty of the University of Szczecin. Sailor, journalist and PhD student of the University of Poznań. Presently president of executive committee (earlier secretary general) of the ruling party Law and Justice, he is well known for his "down to earth" and family oriented perspectives of global politics.

In 2018, Brudziński joined the Polish cabinet as the Minister of the Interior after Mariusz Błaszczak, the previous Interior Minister, became the Minister of National Defence. He is a Member of the European Parliament.

In 2020, Brudziński tweeted that "Poland is the most beautiful without LGBTs".

Brudziński is married with two daughters and a son.

See also 
 List of Sejm members (2005–2007)

References

External links 
 Joachim Brudziński – parliamentary page – includes declarations of interest, voting record, and transcripts of speeches
 Joachim Brudziński – private page

1968 births
Living people
People from Tarnowskie Góry County
University of Szczecin alumni
Deputy Marshals of the Sejm of the Third Polish Republic
Members of the Polish Sejm 2005–2007
Law and Justice politicians
Members of the Polish Sejm 2007–2011
Members of the Polish Sejm 2011–2015
Interior ministers of Poland
MEPs for Poland 2019–2024